Two ships of the Royal Navy have borne the name HMS Tumult:

  was an  launched in 1918 and sold for scrapping in 1928.
  was a T-class destroyer launched in 1942. She was converted to a Type 16 frigate between 1953 and 1954, and was scrapped in 1965.

Royal Navy ship names